The Jamie Whitten Lock and Dam (formerly named Bay Springs Lock and Dam) is part of the Tennessee-Tombigbee Waterway (popularly called the Tenn-Tom).  It is located in south Tishomingo County, Mississippi, United States, close to the Prentiss County line.

It is the northernmost lock and dam on the Tenn-Tom, and was completed at a cost of US$75 million.  The lock is the fourth-highest single lift lock in the United States, and raises and lowers barges .  The dam forms Bay Springs Lake.

Originally named Bay Springs Lock and Dam, the structure was renamed for Jamie Whitten, who served Mississippi in the United States House of Representatives for over 50 years (Whitten had the longest tenure of any Representative in history).

References

External links
Tennessee-Tombigbee Waterway (U.S. Army Corps of Engineers)

Dams in Mississippi
Tennessee–Tombigbee Waterway
Buildings and structures in Tishomingo County, Mississippi